State Highway 23 (SH 23) is a  state highway in Phillips and Sedgwick counties in the northeastern corner of Colorado, United States, that connects U.S. Route 385 (US 385) in Holyoke with Nebraska Highway 23 (N-23) in Nebraska.

Route description
SH 23 begins at an intersection with US 385 (North Interocean Avenue) and Howitt Street in Holyoke, near the city's northern edge. (US 385 heads north toward Julesburg and south to connect with U.S. Route 6 (US 6) in Holyoke, and then on toward Wray, Idalia, and Burlington. Howitt Street heads west along the northern edge of the Phillips County Raceway.) From its southern terminus SH 23 heads very briefly due east (immediately leaving Holyoake) until it reaches the BNSF Railway railway tracks and then turns northeast to run parallel with the tracks through rural agricultural area. About  from the beginning of the route, and after connecting with multiple county roads, SH 23 passed through the census-designated place of Amherst.

Continuing northeast along the north side of the BNSF tracks from Amherst, SH 23 travel through more agricultural area and connects with several more county roads. About  farther northeast, SH 23 reaches its northern terminus at County Road 63.2 (CR 63.2), which runs along the Colorado-Nebraska state line. (The highway continues northeast into Nebraska as Nebraska Highway 23 [NE-23] and quickly enters Venango. CR 63.2 heads north along the state line toward Big Springs, Nebraska and south along the state line toward US 6.)

For its entire length of SH 23 is two-lane road, with no major junctions and, other than Holyoke and Amherst, does not pass near any populated paces.

History

The route established in about 1935, but was originally designated as SH 176. The highway was decommissioned in 1952 but was reinstated in 1968 (still as SH 176).

Major intersections

See also

 List of state highways in Colorado

References

External links

023
Transportation in Phillips County, Colorado
Transportation in Sedgwick County, Colorado